Mehazabien Chowdhury is a Bangladeshi actress, model and the winner of Lux Channel I Superstar 2009. Mehazabien began her acting career after winning Lux Channel I Superstar, (2009) a Bangladeshi beauty pageant.

In 2017, she was starred in the television drama Boro Chele. Mehazabien Chowdhury now brand ambassador of Hair oil brand Nihar Naturals.

Early life and education 
Chowdhury was born on 19 April 1991 in Chittagong, Bangladesh.

Career 
Chowdhury began her career as a model. After winning the Lux Channel I Superstar contest, she signed to appear in Salauddin Lavlu's ‘Waris’. Later, the film was canceled. Chowdhury's first television debut was in Tumi Thako Shindhu Parey. Mehazabien then started to appear in television in commercials.  She played a role as the heroine in romantic-comedy telefilm Ekai 100 and romantic tragedy Boro Chele. In 2015, Mehjabin Chowdhury acted in the Mostofa Sarwar Farooki's film Duboshohor.

In February 2022, her first web film Redrum directed by Vicky Zahed released on Chorki.

Pageantry 
She was crowned as Lux Channel I Superstar in 2009 where Mounita Khan Ishana finished as first runner up and Sadika Swarna finished as second runner up.

Television commercial

Television drama

Web series

Awards and nominations

References

External links

Living people
1991 births
21st-century Bangladeshi actresses
Bengali television actresses
Bangladeshi television actresses
Bangladeshi actresses
Bangladeshi female models
Best TV Actress Meril-Prothom Alo Award winners
CJFB Performance Award Winners